Nicholas David Abbot (born 22 August 1960) is an English radio presenter and currently presents The Late Show on Friday, Saturday and Sunday on LBC.

Early life and career
Abbot was born on 22 August 1960, and was educated at George Heriot's School, an independent school for boys in Edinburgh, and at Brunel University in Uxbridge in West London, where he gained an lower-second class degree in psychology. His professional career began as a Virgin Megastore DJ. He had previously presented student radio at Brunel University's radio station, Radio Brunel.

In early 1987, he joined Radio Luxembourg to present an overnight music show. After hearing American talk show presenter Neil Rogers, Abbot was inspired and the show instead became a phone in. Eventually, a 'straight to air' format was settled upon, where calls would be taken unscreened. This format quickly became a hit with listeners. The absence of a delay system to 'dump' offensive language resulted in callers saying swear words just before they were cut off. It is believed that Abbot was one of the first (if not the first) to take calls straight to air, and later LBC colleague Iain Lee has often confessed that he stole some of his act from Nick (as well as Clive Bull and Tommy Boyd), perhaps hinting he got the inspiration for his "Triple M" show from Nick Abbot in addition to Boyd's "Human Zoo" show.

In October 1988, Abbot launched the new BBC radio station for London, BBC GLR (Greater London Radio). He presented the breakfast show for a year, but his contract was not renewed. He then returned to VMR, where he stayed until 1993.

Radio career in the 1990s

Virgin Radio 
Abbot was part of the original line-up on Virgin Radio in April 1993. There he presented the weekday late night phone-in show SundayThursday from 10pm to 2am. The programme was a mixture of music and phone-in. Not afraid to speak his mind, he often voiced his opinions about other stations and presenters, and it was this that eventually led him into trouble.

Following a negative newspaper review by writer Robin Katz, Abbot's outbursts on-air eventually led to a censure from the Broadcasting Complaints Commission and the Radio Authority. He also called phone-in shows on other radio stations, speaking to the phone operators, commenting on the usually elderly callers while listening to the programmes as he was on hold. Usually, he failed to make it on air, but occasionally he did, including a memorable call to the Scottie McClue show. In June 1994 he was moved to the weekday 710pm show where he had to tone down his act, mainly taking music requests.

In January 1995, he moved back to the weekday late night show (this time from 11pm to 2am) where he remained until April that year when he was moved to the drivetime show (47pm). He was dismissed from the station in September that year, leaving Virgin Radio with a fine of £5,000 for a sexual reference about a fellow DJ, and a further £20,000 for allowing a caller graphically to describe a sexual practice.

Talk Radio 
In the summer of 1996, Abbot was heard on Talk Radio UK acting as holiday cover. He was subsequently offered a regular show during the summer of 1997 on Saturday afternoons, alongside Carol McGiffin, later moving to Saturday evenings from 7:30pm to 10 pm.

Return to Virgin
It was during this period that Virgin Radio's new management re-hired Abbot to cover various shows on the station. He took over the evening show for six weeks during the summer of 1997, as well as providing holiday cover. In early 1998, he took over the weekday afternoon show on Virgin Radio from 1pm to 4 pm, while continuing with his Saturday evening show on Talk Radio. In May 1998 (while still presenting his daily show on Virgin Radio) he took over the weekday evening show on Talk Radio UK from 7pm to 9 pm.

Black Thursday
Thursday 12 November 1998 was known as Black Thursday. Talk Radio UK had been taken over by new management, headed by former The Sun editor Kelvin MacKenzie, and many presenters and staff were fired; Abbot was one of the many casualties, and he was sacked on the same day as the station's afternoon presenter Tommy Boyd. He continued with his weekday show on Virgin Radio, which was now extended to six days a week from 1pm to 4 pm SundaysFridays.

LBC
Between March and September 1999, long-established London station LBC hired Abbot & McGiffin for a Saturday evening phone-in, similar in format to the duo's earlier Talk Radio show. During this time, he continued working for Virgin Radio as a DJ. Throughout the summer of 2000, he presented a Sunday morning phone-in show on Virgin, also hosting the weekday afternoon show. Later that year he moved to the drivetime slot, until leaving Virgin once again, in May 2001. He also provided holiday cover for Chris Evans.

Real Radio
In late 2001, Abbot joined Real Radio (Wales) to host its late-night phone-in show for a week as holiday cover for regular presenter Adrian Allen. October 2001 saw the beginning of a five-day stint at Manchester's Key 103, during which he presented the 10pm2am programme.

In January 2002, he moved to Real Radio (Scotland) where he again presented the late night phone-in. Later in 2002, his show was networked across all three Real Radio stations (Scotland, Wales & Yorkshire).

He presented his last Real Radio show on 19 December 2002, subsequently deciding to take a break from radio for over two years.

Return to radio 
On 3 September 2005 Abbot was heard on London's 102.2 Smooth FM, presenting the Saturday morning show. He stood in for various presenters, including on 'Weekend Breakfast', and covered shows on digital station Planet Rock. This became a regular gig from 17 December 2005 onwards, airing on Saturdays and Sundays from 2–6 pm.

In 2006, he had brief stint standing in on Caroline Feraday's weekend show (10 pm1 am, Friday, Saturday and Sunday nights) on LBC 97.3, from 10 to 19 February. However, he lost his voice during his second show, cutting the show short and being replaced by a recording of his friend and former Virgin and Talk colleague/sparring partner Wendy Lloyd. He was also unable to present the following evening's show, but returned on 17 February for the final three shows of this stint. He subsequently took over a regular slot on LBC on Saturday nights from 10pm to 1am.

Abbot's show had a distinctive style among LBC presenters. It became normal for a summary of the week's news to take place at the start of the show over his opening jingle, "Boogie Woogie" by Liberace (replacing the theme tune he had previously used: "The Beautiful People" by Marilyn Manson). During the show, he played various sound clips including quotes from films such as The Terminator, and clips from his former co-presenter Carol McGiffin.

In late 2007, he took over LBC's weekday evening show from 7pm to 10pm, while continuing with the Planet Rock weekend show (the latter ending in September 2008).

Current radio work 

Abbot now presents a show on LBC from 10 p.m. to 1 a.m. on Fridays, Saturdays and Sundays. Featuring commentary and discussion on current affairs and other subjects, the Friday and Saturday night shows have a strong emphasis on humour. His links and commentaries are punctuated by short dialogue clips drawn from film soundtracks and politicians. Calls to the Friday and Saturday shows are often not on serious topics and callers are given free rein. The Sunday night show has a more formal style (featuring serious topics) and does not feature sound clips or humorous material.

Abbot also usually presents a week of A to Z themed shows on LBC during the Christmas period, covers for other LBC presenters on an occasional basis and writes a blog for the LBC website. In March 2017 he launched a new podcast entitled The Nick Abbot Habit with a second series started in September 2018.

On 5 July 2019, Abbot announced on his show that he and his friend/former co-host Carol McGiffin were set to reunite for a new podcast series called "What's Your Problem With Nick and Carol?" The podcast was released on iTunes, the Global player app, and podcast providers on 20 January 2020.

Books
Abbot has written a series of books, mainly on topics and news from the time of publishing, including Listen to me, I Know Everything   and Do You Mind If I Say A Few Words, which chart his columns through a specific time period.

Bibliography
 Abbot, Nick (2010) 2010 Wrapped Up Like a Bag of Chips
 Abbot, Nick (2012) Do You Mind If I Say A Few Words?
 Abbot, Nick (2014) I Suppose You're Wondering About What This Is All About...: Well, I Can't Tell You Because I Don't Know Myself
 Abbot, Nick (2015) Listen to Me, I Know Everything
 Abbot, Nick (2017) Well, the Whole World's Gone Crazy
 Abbot, Nick (2018) MY TREMENDOUS YEAR IN THE HUGE SHADOW OF DONALD TRUMP'S AWESOME ORANGE BIGLINESS
 Abbot, Nick (2019) The Car Crash 24 Hour a Day Multiple Newsgasm: The View from the Back Seat
 Abbot, Nick (2021) The Ups and Downs, the Cheese and Wine of 2021: Includes the Full A-Z of 2021

References

External links 
 Nick Abbot on LBC
 LBC Plus – Nick Abbot's LBC Premium Podcasts (Requires subscription)
 

English radio DJs
Virgin Radio (UK)
Alumni of Brunel University London
People educated at George Heriot's School
Living people
1960 births
LBC radio presenters
Shock jocks